The Kurpark, German for "Spa Park", is a public park in the centre of Wiesbaden, Germany, stretching from the Wilhelmstraße to the southern borders of the district of Sonneberg and lying immediately behind the Kurhaus convention center. It has been described as the most beautiful park in Wiesbaden.

References

Urban public parks
Gardens in Hesse
Gardens in Germany
Tourist attractions in Wiesbaden
Culture in Wiesbaden
Continental gardens in the English Landscape Garden style